George Lowe (1 June 1847 – 3 April 1922) was a New Zealand cricketer. He played in two first-class matches for Wellington from 1873 to 1875.

See also
 List of Wellington representative cricketers

References

External links
 

1847 births
1922 deaths
New Zealand cricketers
Wellington cricketers
Cricketers from Wellington City